Health Dialog, part of the Rite Aid Corporation family of healthcare companies, provides personalized population health services to health plans, providers, employers and pharmaceutical manufacturers. The company helps their clients improve quality of care and reduce healthcare costs while empowering members to make informed health and wellness decisions.
The company has been offering population health services since 1997. They offer multi-channel health coaching with registered nurses who are licensed to practice in all 50 states, D.C. and Guam and hold multiple accreditations and certifications from URAC, NCQA and HITRUST.

Health Coaches and Care Navigators
Health Dialog staffs their population health management programs with highly trained, experienced Health Coaches and Care Navigators. These Health Coaches and Care Navigators have an average tenure of 10 years of experience and receive annual training in cultural diversity and sensitivity skills. They use their clinical knowledge, plus a variety of tools and resources, to support the needs of all populations in order to evaluate and then guide members to improved whole-being health.

Pathways Engine
Health Dialog’s Pathways Engine, the organization’s predictive analytics and machine learning platform, was developed to identify actionable health management opportunities that improve people’s lives and reduce the cost of healthcare.
Unlike traditional methodologies, Health Dialog’s analytics combines clinical and non-clinical data to capture the multidimensional array of factors that influence one’s health status and healthcare decisions. This ranges from claims, health risk assessment responses and biometric values to census information, consumer data assets (to assess purchasing capabilities and behaviors), social determinants of health (SDOH), household composition, health attitudes and communication preferences.

Results
The company’s partnerships with their clients have achieved some remarkable results, including reducing hospitalizations, increasing medication adherence and delivering significant savings. Some of the measurable results include an 11% average reduction in medical costs, 13.36% higher adherence to statins, 93% satisfaction with Health Coaches, and 73% of Nurse Advice Line callers pre-intent on visiting the emergency department or calling 911 being redirected to a more appropriate and less emergent level of care.

Rite Aid
Health care companies established in 1997
Multinational companies
Health care companies based in New Hampshire